Elizabeth Muthuka (born 1975) is runner form Kenya who concentrates on 400 metres. Her surname is sometimes spelled Muthoka.

Muthuka won 100, 200 and 400 metres races at the 2005 Kenyan Athletics Championships and has won number of national championships since then. She competed at the 2006 African Championships in Athletics 400 metres race. She reached the semifinals at the 2007 All-Africa Games. At the 2008 African Championships she finished 7th in 400 metres final  and helped the Kenyan 4*400 metres relay team to reach the final. However, she did not take part in the final, where Kenya finished second.

She broke the 400 metres Kenyan record at the Kenyan Championships in July 2008 by running 51.53. The previous record, 51.56 by Ruth Waithera was set in 1984. A week later she lowered the record to 50.82 at the Kenyan Olympic trials. She was selected to compete for Kenya at the 2008 Summer Olympics. She had, however, failed a doping test at the Kenyan athletics championships and thus did not compete at the Olympics. She tested positive for Nandrolone and was given a two-year ban by Athletics Kenya. In addition, her 400 metres Kenyan records were erased.

She had returned to competition in early 2011.

References

External links 

1975 births
Living people
Kenyan female sprinters
Doping cases in athletics
Kenyan sportspeople in doping cases
Athletes (track and field) at the 2007 All-Africa Games
African Games competitors for Kenya